Jason Grimes (born September 10, 1959) is an American long jumper. Graduate of Overbrook High School in Philadelphia, Pennsylvania. Among his accomplishments, he took a silver medal at the 1983 World Championships in Athletics and was All-American at the University of Tennessee.

References

External links
 

1959 births
Living people
American male long jumpers
Place of birth missing (living people)
World Athletics Championships medalists
Universiade medalists in athletics (track and field)
Universiade gold medalists for the United States
Medalists at the 1981 Summer Universiade